
The following lists events that happened during 1849 in South Africa.

Events
 Diocesan College (Bishops) founded in Rondebosch, Cape Town by Robert Gray (bishop of Cape Town).
 The British propose to ship convicts to the Cape Colony, but the Cape population strongly object and it is squashed with the help of British MP Charles Bowyer Adderley
 The street Heerengracht in Cape Town is changed to Adderley Street in honour of Adderley who help stop the shipping of convicts
 The first Jewish Congregation is founded in Cape Town
 The Byrne Settlers start arriving in Natal

References
See Years in South Africa for list of References

 
South Africa
Years in South Africa